Stephen Warfield Gambrill (October 2, 1873 – December 19, 1938) was an American politician.

Early life

Born near Savage, Maryland, to Stephen Gambrill and Kate (Gorman) Gambrill,  he attended the common schools and Maryland Agricultural College (now the University of Maryland, College Park. He graduated from the law department of Columbian College (now The George Washington University Law School), Washington, D.C., in 1896, was admitted to the bar in 1897, and practiced in Baltimore, Maryland.  In 1900, he married Haddie D. Gorman (who died in 1923).

Career
Gambrill served as a member of the Maryland House of Delegates from 1920 to 1922, and served in the Maryland State Senate in 1924.  He was elected from the fifth district of Maryland as a Democrat to the Sixty-eighth Congress to fill the vacancy caused by the death of Sidney E. Mudd II and was reelected to the Sixty-ninth and to the six succeeding Congresses, serving from November 4, 1924, until his death in Washington, D.C.

Death
He died on December 19, 1938, and is interred in Cedar Hill Cemetery, Suitland, Maryland.

See also
 List of United States Congress members who died in office (1900–49)

References

1873 births
1924 deaths
Democratic Party members of the Maryland House of Delegates
University of Maryland, College Park alumni
George Washington University Law School alumni
Democratic Party members of the United States House of Representatives from Maryland
People from Savage, Maryland
Gorman family of Maryland